O Judeu may refer to: 

"The Jew", Portuguese writer António José da Silva
O Judeu, 1866 novel by Camilo Castelo Branco about da Silva
The Jew (film) 1995 historical film about da Silva